Maria Guschina is a Russian sport shooter with three IPSC Handgun World Shoot titles (2011, 2014 and 2017) in the Lady Production Division. In addition to being a dominant shooter in the Lady category, she has also asserted herself strongly in the Overall category against male shooters in several major IPSC Level 3 events and above. She made an impressive performance at the 2017 World Shoot when she both came 1st in the Lady category in Production and in 6th place in Production Overall with a score of 98.23% of match winner Ben Stoeger. The production division was also the division with the toughest competition and the largest number of participants. Maria has also proven herself in practical rifle, taking bronze in the 2017 IPSC Rifle World Shoot in the Open Lady category and second in the 2015 IPSC European Rifle Championship.

References 

Russian female sport shooters
IPSC shooters
IPSC World Shoot Champions
Living people
1995 births
21st-century Russian women